Jwala is a 1985 Indian Telugu-language film, directed by Ravi Raja Pinisetty. The film stars Chiranjeevi in a dual role, Raadhika, Silk Smitha and Bhanupriya. The film's score was composed by Ilaiyaraaja. The film was dubbed in Malayalam as Prathikara Jwala. The film was remade in Kannada in 1987 as Sathyam Shivam Sundaram starring Vishnuvardhan in triple roles ( including the role of the father) unlike this movie.

Cast
 Chiranjeevi as Raju and Yuvaraju (Double Role)
 Radhika as Janaki
 Bhanupriya as Bhanu
 Kaikala Satyanarayana as SP Chakravarthy
 Kannada Prabhakar as Sarvottama Rao
Gummadi
 P. Sai Kumar as Sarvottama Rao's son
 Allu Rama Lingaiah as Pattabhi
 Annapoorna as Poorna
 Silk Smitha
Jaya Malini
J.V. Ramana Murthi
Ceylon Manohar as Manohar
Rallapalli
Chitti Babu
Vijaya Ranga Raju as Sarvottama Rao's henchman

Soundtrack
The music was composed by Ilaiyaraaja.
Telugu version

References

External links
 

1985 films
Indian action films
1980s masala films
1980s Telugu-language films
Films scored by Ilaiyaraaja
Telugu films remade in other languages
Films directed by Ravi Raja Pinisetty
1985 action films